The Notre Dame of Isulan is a private, Catholic basic education institution run by the Archdiocesan Notre Dame Schools of Cotabato in Isulan, Sultan Kudarat, Philippines. It was established in 1957.  It is a member of the Notre Dame Educational Association, a group of Notre Dame Schools in the Philippines under the patronage of the Blessed Virgin Mary. It offers Elementary, Junior High School Day/Night and Senior High School Programs.

Schools in Sultan Kudarat
Educational institutions established in 1957
Notre Dame Educational Association
1957 establishments in the Philippines